Filiași is a town in Dolj County, Oltenia, Romania, on the river Jiu. The town administers six villages: Almăjel, Bâlta, Braniște, Fratoștița, Răcarii de Sus and Uscăci.

Natives
 Irinel Popescu

References

Towns in Romania
Populated places in Dolj County
Localities in Oltenia